Labori High School is a school in Paarl, Western Cape, South Africa.

History 
Labori was founded on 22 May 1933, it was originally named Paarl Commercial High School. Since 1989 it was renamed to Labori High School, it started then to give the Commercial, Technical and General fields of subjects.

The School Badge 

In red between two gears of gold is a silver upright-positioned column and note a round disk of blue charged with a fleur-de-lis of gold, on a silver chief a red mercuriushat.

Symbolism of badge

The classic Mercuriushat with its two wings in chief (in red on black) as a symbol of commercial use, as the sg. Mercuriusstaf in the arms of the Cape Technical College.

On the main part of the shield (with a red background) is the silver column or pillar, a symbol of resilience and wisdom.

In the column with a gold fleur-de-lis on a blue disc symbolizes the Paarl (Paarl part of the weapon) and is also on the provincial badge. The golden gears both sides of the column is an overall symbol of the technical fields of study and give balance to the weapon as a whole.

The gold band with the motto on it serves as a foundation or prop and rounds it all off.

References

External links 
Official website

Educational institutions established in 1933
High schools in South Africa
Schools in the Western Cape
1933 establishments in South Africa